Ronald Yeats (born 15 November 1937) is a Scottish former association footballer. He was a key defender in the rejuvenation of Dundee United in the early 1960s. He then spent a decade at Liverpool captaining them to six trophies in the mid-1960s. He later had three years as player/manager at Tranmere Rovers. Yeats was also player/manager at Barrow and Santa Barbara Condors. He also made appearances for the Scotland national team.

Early years and Dundee United
Yeats was an Under-15 schoolboy international who played for Aberdeen Lads' Club, a Junior club in his home town of Aberdeen. In 1956, following a leg break, Yeats had a trial with Elgin City, then a Highland League club, but was not offered a contract. In 1957 he was signed by Dundee United, then a part-time club of Scottish Division Two. Previous to signing for the club, he worked in a slaughter house in Aberdeen.

Yeats' career took an upward turn following Jerry Kerr's appointment: Kerr regarded Yeats as so vital to the fortunes of the team he sought his release to play each Saturday from the military authorities while Yeats served his National Service. In 1959–60, Kerr's first full season in charge, St Johnstone finished as Division Two champions. United's challengers for the second promotion spot were Hamilton Academical and Queen of the South. Hamilton were beaten 5–1 at Tannadice with seven games to go before a crowd of over 11,000, putting Hamilton firmly in United's rear view. United went to Palmerston Park to play the Ivor Broadis inspired Queen of the South with three games to go. United returned home with a 4–4 draw to maintain their one-point advantage over QoS. Promotion was clinched with a last game of the season 1–0 home win against Berwick Rangers before a crowd of near 17,000. This brought top division football back to Tannadice Park for the first time since they had been relegated in 1932.

In the following 1960–61 season, United retained their top division place, finishing in ninth. Other players to flourish like Yeats were the forward pair Dennis Gillespie and Jim Irvine. Yeats played 118 matches (95 in the league) for Dundee United.

Liverpool
Yeats, a stockily-built 6 ft 2 in central defender, was bought by manager Bill Shankly in 1961 from United for a fee of around £20,000 and was immediately installed as captain. When Yeats was signed, Shankly was so impressed with the physical presence of his new player that he told waiting journalists "The man is a mountain, go into the dressing room and walk around him". Shankly later described Yeats' arrival, along with that of striker Ian St John also in the 1961 close season, as the "turning point" as Liverpool began their quest to compete with — and beat — the best in England and in Europe. Yeats made his debut in a 2–0 league victory over Bristol Rovers at Eastville on 19 August 1961. After Yeats' first season, Liverpool gained promotion from the Second Division with a runaway eight point margin over their nearest rivals (two points for a win) after eight seasons away from English football's top flight. His first goal came on 23 November 1963 in the 75th minute of the 1–0 First Division victory over Manchester United at Old Trafford. Yeats lived up to the reputation and the nickname ("The Colossus") his huge frame gave him, playing at the heart of Liverpool's defence for a decade and winning the club's first major honours in nearly 20 years.

Liverpool were the 1963–64 Football League Champions. The next season, they won the 1964–65 FA Cup beating Leeds United 2–1 after extra time in the final at Wembley. This was the club's first ever win of that trophy. However Liverpool lost in the European Cup semi-final to Inter Milan that season.

The next season Yeats skippered Liverpool to the 1965–66 Football League title. In Europe Liverpool reached the 1966 UEFA Cup Winners' Cup Final at Hampden Park in Yeats native Scotland. However Liverpool lost out after extra time to Borussia Dortmund.

In the 1966–67 European Cup second round, Yeats and co were given a torrid time by a Johan Cruyff inspired Ajax who won 5–1 in Amsterdam and 7–3 on aggregate.

The success of Liverpool then dried up, and he was one of the high-profile victims of a massive cull of the older players which Shankly ruthlessly undertook in 1970 in an effort to rebuild the side for a new decade. After 454 games, Yeats left in 1971.

Yeats won both his full caps for Scotland during the three seasons when the Liverpool team of the 1960s were at their peak. The first came on 3 October 1964 in a 3–2 defeat to Wales at Ninian Park Cardiff. His second was a year later in December 1965 in a world cup qualification decider away to Italy. The Scots had beaten the Italians 1–0 at Hampden Park. However Jock Stein's side missing the absent Denis Law went out when losing 3–0 in Naples.

Tranmere Rovers

Yeats served Tranmere Rovers for three years as player manager.

Stalybridge and Barrow

Yeats had a short spell playing for Stalybridge Celtic. He then served Barrow as player manager.

Career in America

In 1976 at age 38, he joined the Los Angeles Skyhawks of the American Soccer League at the request of Skyhawk coach Ron Newman. In his only season there, he played sweeper and anchored the defence of the A.S.L. champion Skyhawks.

In 1977, he became the player coach of the American Soccer League's Santa Barbara Condors expansion team.

Formby and Rhyl

Returning to Liverpool, he had a short spell at the start of the 1977–78 season playing for Formby before moving to Rhyl in November 1977.

Liverpool (scouting)

In 1986 Yeats returned to Anfield as the club's chief scout responsible for delegating duties to the club's talent spotters. He remained in that role until his retirement in May 2006.

Legacy

Yeats was voted 29th in the official Liverpool website poll '100 Players Who Shook The Kop'.

In April 2009, Yeats was made an 'Honorary Scouser' by the Lord Mayor of Liverpool.

He is referenced in the Everton song "Royal Blue Mersey" in the line "We hate Bill Shankly and we hate St. John, but most of all we hate Big Ron."

Career statistics

Honours
Dundee United
Scottish Division Two promotion: 1959–60

Liverpool
Football League Division One: 1963–64, 1965–66
Football League Division Two: 1961–62
FA Cup: 1964–65
FA Charity Shield: 1964, 1965, 1966  

L.A. Skyhawks
American Soccer League: 1975–76

References

External links
Thisisanfield.com Forgotten Heroes
Official Liverpool Football Club past player profile
Player profile at LFChistory.net
Exclusive interview at LFChistory.net
Another Exclusive interview at LFChistory.net
Ron Yeats at liverweb.org.uk
Gazetteer for Scotland famous people

1937 births
Living people
Footballers from Aberdeen
Scottish footballers
Scotland international footballers
Dundee United F.C. players
Liverpool F.C. players
Tranmere Rovers F.C. players
Scottish football managers
Tranmere Rovers F.C. managers
Barrow A.F.C. managers
Liverpool F.C. non-playing staff
American Soccer League (1933–1983) players
Los Angeles Skyhawks players
Formby F.C. players
Stalybridge Celtic F.C. players
Barrow A.F.C. players
Scottish Football League players
English Football League players
Scottish expatriate footballers
Scottish expatriate football managers
Expatriate soccer players in the United States
Rhyl F.C. players
Association football central defenders
Scottish expatriate sportspeople in the United States
Player-coaches
American Soccer League (1933–1983) coaches
Scottish Junior Football Association players
FA Cup Final players